Thomas Patrick Barber (born December 1, 1966) is a United States district judge of the United States District Court for the Middle District of Florida.

Education and legal career 
Barber was born on December 1, 1966, in Pittsburgh, Pennsylvania. He earned his Bachelor of Arts from the University of Florida, where he was inducted into Phi Beta Kappa, and his Juris Doctor from the University of Pennsylvania Law School. After graduating law school, he practiced for five years in the trial and business litigation department of Carlton Fields, P.A. He then served as an Assistant Statewide Prosecutor in the Office of Statewide Prosecution and as an Assistant State Attorney for the Thirteenth Judicial Circuit. Upon completion of his service as a prosecutor he returned to Carlton Fields, P.A., where his practice focused on business litigation until his appointment to the bench.

State court service 
In 2004, Governor Jeb Bush appointed Barber to the Hillsborough County Court. Barber was elevated to the Thirteenth Judicial Circuit Court of Florida by Charlie Crist in 2008. He was most recently re-elected to a new six-year term in 2016. His state court service ended when he was commissioned as a federal judge.

Federal judicial service 

On April 26, 2018, President Donald Trump announced his intent to nominate Barber to serve as a United States District Judge of the United States District Court for the Middle District of Florida. On May 7, 2018, his nomination was sent to the Senate. He was nominated to the seat vacated by Judge James D. Whittemore, who assumed senior status on August 29, 2017. On October 17, 2018, a hearing on his nomination was held before the Senate Judiciary Committee.

On January 3, 2019, his nomination was returned to the President under Rule XXXI, Paragraph 6 of the United States Senate. On January 23, 2019, President Trump announced his intent to renominate Barber for a federal judgeship. His nomination was sent to the Senate later that day. On February 7, 2019, his nomination was reported out of committee by a 20–2 vote. On June 11, 2019, the Senate voted 75–21 to invoke cloture on the nomination. On June 12, 2019, his nomination was confirmed by a 77–19 vote. He received his judicial commission on July 11, 2019.

References

External links 
 
 Profile on Thirteenth Judicial District: Hillsborough County
 

1966 births
Living people
20th-century American lawyers
21st-century American lawyers
21st-century American judges
Federalist Society members
Florida lawyers
Florida state court judges
Judges of the United States District Court for the Middle District of Florida
Lawyers from Pittsburgh
State attorneys
Stetson University College of Law faculty
United States district court judges appointed by Donald Trump
University of Florida alumni
University of Pennsylvania Law School alumni
University of South Florida faculty